Madder Mortem is a Norwegian progressive metal band. They were originally formed by siblings Agnete and BP M. Kirkevaag in 1993 as a doom metal/gothic metal band as Mystery Tribe, but changed the name to Madder Mortem in 1997.

The group released their first full-length album, Mercury, in 1999, but the band's label folded soon after its release, and all members except the Kirkevaags left. A new lineup recorded the All Flesh Is Grass album for a new label, Century Media, in 2001, and Deadlands followed on The End Records in 2002, after which further lineup changes ensued. On 21 July 2014 the band announced the addition of a new guitar player, Richard Wikstrand, formerly of Chrome Division.

Red In Tooth And Claw, their sixth full-length album, was released on 28 October 2016 via Dark Essence Records. The band followed with the worldwide release of Marrow on 21 September 2018.  The release of Marrow also coincided with another lineup change, with guitarist Richard Wikstrand being replaced by Anders Langberg, known from Souls Of Tide.

Live performances 
In September/October 2001, Madder Mortem supported Tristania, Rotting Christ, and Vintersorg on a 23-date European tour. During February and March 2003 Madder Mortem supported Opeth on the European leg of their "Deliverance" tour. In addition to various cities across Western Europe, the Opeth tour also brought them to the UK for the first time, with a total of 33 gigs.

They have played festivals including Brutal Assault in the Czech Republic, Popkomm in Germany, Yuletide Metal Meeting in Northern Ireland, and Conmusic in Mexico; as well as the Norwegian festivals Transistorfestivalen, Southern Discomfort, Inferno Metal Festival, and Quart Festival.

With guitarist Richard Wilkstrand, Madder Mortem performed at the festival Livestock at Alvdal in rural Norway on 11 July 2014. In 2017, the band supported the Soen European Lykaia tour.

Members

Current lineup 
 Agnete M. Kirkevaag − lead vocals (1993–present)
 BP M. Kirkevaag − guitar, percussion, backing vocals (1993–present)
 Mads Solås − drums, percussion, backing vocals (1999–present)
 Tormod Langøien Moseng − bass guitar, double bass, backing vocals (2003–present)
 Anders Langberg − guitar (2018–present)

Former members 
 Christian Ruud − guitar, backing vocals (1993–1999)
 Boye Nyberg − bass guitar (1993–1999)
 Sigurd Nilsen − drums, percussion (1996–1999)
 Eirik Ulvo Langnes − guitar (2000–2003)
 Paul Mozart Bjørke − bass guitar, percussion, keyboards, backing vocals (2000–2003)
 Odd Eivind Ebbesen − guitar (2003–2010)
 Patrick Scantlebury − guitar (2010–2014)
 Richard Wikstrand − guitar (2014–2018)

Discography

Full-Lengths 
 Mercury (1999)
 All Flesh Is Grass (2001)
 Deadlands (2002)
 Desiderata (2006)
 Eight Ways (2009)
 Red in Tooth and Claw (2016)
  Marrow (2018)

Demos 
 Misty Sleep (1997)
 Demo 98 (1998)
 Demo 2000 (2000)

Singles and EPs 
 "My Name is Silence" (single, 2007)
 Where Dream and Day Collide (EP, 2010) GRC #32

References

External links 
 Official website

Norwegian progressive metal musical groups
Norwegian doom metal musical groups
Musical groups established in 1993
1993 establishments in Norway
Musical groups from Hedmark